Each Other may refer to:
Each Other, a 2016 album by Aidan Knight
Each Other, a 2019 EP by Ängie
"Each Other", a song on the 2011 album Here I Am by Kelly Rowland